Phillip Simmonds (born May 18, 1986) is a professional tennis player from the United States.

Junior career
Simmonds had a promising junior career, spending time as the number ranked doubles player on the ITF rankings. He was a member of the United States team that finished runners-up in the 2002 Junior Davis Cup and in the same year won the doubles at the Orange Bowl, with Scott Oudsema. Simmonds and Oudsema would go on to claim the 2003 Australian Open boys' doubles title, the first American male pairing to win the competition. They defeated the Romanian pairing of Florin Mergea and Horia Tecău in the final. In 2003, he also reached the boys' doubles semi-finals at the French Open and Wimbledon, partnering Brian Baker.

Professional career
Simmonds was given a wildcard into the 2006 US Open main draw, but couldn't get past 25th seed Richard Gasquet in the opening round. He competed in the men's doubles at the US Open three times, in 2004, 2006, and 2007, but fell in the first round each time.

He has won three Challenger titles in his career. In 2006 he won the singles title at the León Challenger tournament and he has also won two doubles titles, at Nouméa in 2007 and Baton Rouge the following year. As of the end of 2012, he has won nine ITF Futures titles, three in singles and six in doubles.

Junior Grand Slam finals

Doubles: 1 (1 title)

ATP Challenger and ITF Futures finals

Singles: 6 (4–2)

Doubles: 13 (8–5)

Performance timeline

Singles

References

External links
 
 

1986 births
Living people
American male tennis players
African-American male tennis players
Australian Open (tennis) junior champions
Tennis people from New York (state)
People from Selden, New York
Grand Slam (tennis) champions in boys' doubles
21st-century African-American sportspeople
20th-century African-American people